Tree is an album by Irish folk singer Johnny Duhan.

Track listing
 "And the Band Played"
 "After the Dance" 
 "Inviolate" 
 "The Dark Side" 
 "All at Once"
 "Your Sure Hand"
 "The Second Time Around"
 "Ireland"
 "Morning Star"
 "We've Come Through the Night"

External links
Amazon.com
Homepage

2002 albums
Johnny Duhan albums